S. N. Surendar (born 17 February 1953) is an Indian playback singer, dubbing artist and actor who primarily works in Tamil films. He has sung over 500 songs under various music directors for Telugu, Malayalam, Kannada and Tamil languages.

He is also a professional dubbing artiste and has dubbed for almost 600 films, of which more than 75 films accounts for actor Mohan.

Surendar has also done films like Yaaga Saalai as an actor.

Personal life
He has an elder daughter Pallavi Surendar a playback singer now settled in Dubai & his son  Hari Prashanth played the character of young Vikram in Anniyan (2005). He is the brother of Shoba Chandrasekhar, brother-in-law of S. A. Chandrasekhar, and maternal uncle of Vijay.

Filmography

Actor
Yaaga Saalai (1980)
Naalaiya Theerpu (1992)
Priyamudan (1998)
Urimai Por (1998)
Nenjinile (1999)
Chennai 600028 (2007)
Thiraipada Nagaram (2015)
Chennai 600028 II: Second Innings (2016)
Ninu Veedani Needanu Nene (2019; Telugu)

Dubbing artist

Discography

Awards

Surendar has received the Kalaimamani Award for the year 1999 and has won the Best Dubbing Artist Award in 2005 given by the Tamil Nadu State government.

References

External links
 

1953 births
Living people
Male actors in Tamil cinema
Indian male voice actors
Indian male playback singers
Kannada playback singers
Tamil playback singers
Singers from Chennai
Tamil Nadu State Film Awards winners